The Angell–Brewster House in Lebanon, Oregon, is a building from 1855. It was listed on the National Register of Historic Places in 1992. It was removed from the register on April 20, 2011, after being demolished in 2010.

References

External links
Historic images of Angell–Brewster House from the University of Oregon digital archives

Houses on the National Register of Historic Places in Oregon
Georgian architecture in Oregon
Houses completed in 1855
Former National Register of Historic Places in Oregon
Lebanon, Oregon
Houses in Linn County, Oregon
1855 establishments in Oregon Territory
National Register of Historic Places in Linn County, Oregon